Scutiger muliensis is a species of amphibian in the family Megophryidae. It is endemic to Sichuan, China, where it is only known from the area of its type locality in Muli county (southwestern Sichuan), altitude  asl. Its common name is Muli cat-eyed toad.

Description
Males measure  and females  in snout–vent length. Scutiger muliensis resembles Scutiger mammatus but males have black spiny warts on the chest glands that are large, few and scattered, webbing between toes is poorly developed, and there are small warts around the vent and on the ventral side of the thighs and soles.

Habitat and conservation
This species' natural habitats are low-gradient streams and riparian habitats, mainly shrubland. It is threatened by habitat loss caused by overgrazing and increasing human settlement.

References

muliensis
Amphibians of China
Endemic fauna of Sichuan
Amphibians described in 1986
Taxonomy articles created by Polbot
Endangered Fauna of China